Susan Heyward is an American actress. She starred in the PlayStation Network original series Powers (2015–16) and HBO period drama Vinyl (2016). From 2018 to 2019, Heyward had a recurring role as Tamika Ward in the Netflix comedy-drama series Orange Is the New Black. On stage, she made her Broadway debut in the 2013 production of The Trip to Bountiful and in 2018-2019 played Rose Granger-Weasley in the Broadway production of Harry Potter and the Cursed Child.

Life and career
Heyward was born and raised in Atlanta Georgia and graduated with BFA from Carnegie Mellon University. She began her career appearing in Off-Broadway productions and guest-starring roles on television series including Law & Order and 30 Rock. In 2009, she was regular cast member in the short-lived Comedy Central comedy series Michael & Michael Have Issues. In 2014, she had a recurring role in the Fox thriller series The Following. In 2013, she made her Broadway debut appearing opposite Cicely Tyson in The Trip to Bountiful. Her off-Broadway credits include title role in Sabrina Fair and The Purple Lights of Joppa Illinois. Her film credits include Mother of George (2013) starring Danai Gurira, Poltergeist (2015), The Incredible Jessica James (2017) and The Light of the Moon (2017).

In 2015, Heyward was cast in the leading role alongside Sharlto Copley and Eddie Izzard in the PlayStation Network's first scripted original series, Powers. The series was canceled after two seasons. In 2016, she co-starred in the HBO period drama series, Vinyl playing the role of personal secretary to Bobby Cannavale's lead character. From 2018 to 2019, Heyward played the role of Tamika Ward, the new Warden in Litchfield prison in the Netflix comedy-drama series, Orange Is the New Black. In 2018, Heyward was cast as Rose Granger-Weasley in the Broadway production of Harry Potter and the Cursed Child.

Filmography

Film

Television

Stage

References

External links

Living people
American stage actresses
American film actresses
American television actresses
Actresses from Philadelphia
21st-century American actresses
African-American actresses
1982 births
21st-century African-American women
21st-century African-American people
20th-century African-American people
20th-century African-American women